Vice Admiral Sir Somerford Francis Teagle  (born 9 June 1938) is a retired senior officer of the Royal New Zealand Navy (RNZN).

Teagle was born in Lower Hutt on 9 June 1938. His parents were Leonard Herbert Teagle and Muriel Frances Teagle. He was educated at Wellesley College in Wellington, Christ's College in Christchurch, the Britannia Royal Naval College in Dartmouth, the Joint Services Staff College in Canberra, and the Canadian National Defence College.

Teagle served as Chief of Naval Staff, the professional head of the RNZN, from 1989 to 1991, and in New Zealand's most senior military post as Chief of Defence Force from 1991 until his retirement in 1995. He is notable for having ended the rum ration in the RNZN, with effect from March 1990.

In 1977, Teagle received the Queen Elizabeth II Silver Jubilee Medal, and in 1990 he was awarded the New Zealand 1990 Commemoration Medal. In the 1994 Queen's Birthday Honours, he was appointed a Knight Commander of the Order of the British Empire.

References

|-

1938 births
Living people
New Zealand Knights Commander of the Order of the British Empire
Royal New Zealand Navy admirals
People from Lower Hutt
People educated at Christ's College, Christchurch
People educated at Wellesley College, New Zealand